Shiran (also Romanized as Shīrān; also known as Dowlatābad) is a village in Khanamrud Rural District, in the Central District of Heris County, East Azerbaijan Province, Iran. At the 2006 census, its population was 71, in 20 families.

References 

Populated places in Heris County